Agioi Pantes is a settlement on the island of Zakynthos, Greece. It is located 6 kilometers from Machairado and 14 kilometers from Zakynthos City. In 1981, the population of Agioi Pantes was around 262 inhabitants. In 1991, the population slightly rose to around 283 inhabitants.

External links
Greek Travel Pages - Agii Pantes

Populated places in Zakynthos